Hollandsche Beton Groep nv (HBG) was a Netherlands-based construction group founded in 1902. It expanded internationally in the late 20th century, acquiring businesses in the United Kingdom, before being itself acquired by Netherlands competitor Royal BAM NBM to form the Royal BAM Group.

History
Hollandsche Beton Groep NV was founded in 1902 as Hollandsche Beton Maatschappij NV (HBM). In 1960, its Indonesian business was nationalized and eventually became PT Hutama Karya (Persero). During the 1970s, HBG began expanding overseas, acquiring the UK-based civil engineering contracting firm Edmund Nuttall Ltd in 1978.

It then grew its UK building interests further by acquiring Kyle Stewart in 1989, Glasgow-based contractor GA Holdings (formerly Gilbert Ash) in 1992 and Higgs and Hill in 1996. Initially, the three individual companies' names were retained with the HBG prefix, later becoming HBG Construction with effect from 1 January 1999.

In February 2002, the whole group was the subject of a takeover bid by Spain's Dragados Group that was cleared by European competition authorities in April 2002. However, the deal was short-lived - in June 2002, Dragados sold off HBG to Dutch group Royal BAM NBM to form the Koninklijke BAM Groep and pave the way for Dragados's merger with a domestic competitor, ACS. In 2008, HBG was rebranded as BAM; the UK civil engineering business became BAM Nuttall, while HBG Construction became BAM Construct UK.

References

Construction and civil engineering companies of the Netherlands
Construction and civil engineering companies  established in 1902
Dutch companies established in 1902